Ryan "Bacher" Bach (born October 21, 1973) is a Canadian former professional hockey goaltender. He played three games in the National Hockey League for the Los Angeles Kings during the 1998–99 season. The rest of his career, which lasted from 1996 to 2004, was mainly spent in the minor leagues. Bach was drafted by the Detroit Red Wings in the 11th round of the 1992 NHL Entry Draft. He played college hockey at Colorado College before turning pro in 1996.

Career statistics

Regular season and playoffs

Awards and honours

References

External links
 

1973 births
Adirondack Red Wings players
AHCA Division I men's ice hockey All-Americans
Belfast Giants players
Canadian expatriate ice hockey players in England
Canadian expatriate ice hockey players in Northern Ireland
Canadian expatriate ice hockey players in the United States
Canadian ice hockey goaltenders
Colorado College Tigers men's ice hockey players
Colorado Eagles players
Detroit Red Wings draft picks
Houston Aeros (1994–2013) players
Ice hockey people from Alberta
Kansas City Blades players
Living people
Long Beach Ice Dogs (IHL) players
Los Angeles Kings players
Louisville Panthers players
Sheffield Steelers players
Sportspeople from Sherwood Park
Toledo Storm players
Utah Grizzlies (IHL) players
Utica Blizzard players
Wilkes-Barre/Scranton Penguins players